Ravensbourne School may refer to:

Ravensbourne School (Bromley)
Ravensbourne School (Dunedin)
Ravensbourne School (Havering)